The 2021–22 season was the 35th season in the existence of Nîmes Olympique and the club's first season back in the second division of French football. In addition to the domestic league, Nîmes participated in this season's edition of the Coupe de France.

Players

First-team squad

Transfers

Out

Pre-season and friendlies

Competitions

Overall record

Ligue 2

League table

Results summary

Results by round

Matches
The league fixtures were announced on 25 June 2021.

Coupe de France

Notes

References

Nîmes Olympique seasons
Nîmes